Matteo Mantero (born 23 August 1974) is an Italian politician. He was elected to the Chamber of Deputies in 2013, and moved to the Senate in 2018. Originally from the Five Star Movement, he defected to Power to the People in 2021, becoming the party's first representative in Parliament. He sits in the Mixed Group.

References 

1974 births
Living people

Deputies of Legislature XVII of Italy
Senators of Legislature XVIII of Italy
21st-century Italian politicians
University of Genoa alumni
Five Star Movement politicians
Italian eurosceptics
20th-century Italian people